I Can See Clearly Now is the Grammy-nominated third album released by Gospel Gangstaz.  It was released on May 18, 1999 for B-Rite Records and featured production by Mr. Solo, Tik Tokk, Chillie' Baby, DeMarie "Meech" Sheki, Twenty20 and Trackmasters.  I Can See Clearly made it on three Billboard charts, 25 on the Top Heatseekers, 11 on the Top Christian Albums and 3 on the Top Gospel Albums. I Can See Clearly Now was a critical success and remains the group's most successful album. At the 42nd Annual Grammy Awards, the album was nominated for the Best Rock Gospel Album, however it lost to Rebecca St. James' Pray.

Track listing 
"Amazin' Grace" – :32 
"I Can See Clearly Now" – 4:09 
"I Call Your Name" – 4:18 
"Once Was Blind" – 4:32 
"Questions" – 4:31 
"One Way" – 4:23 
"What'cha Gonna Do?" – 4:21 
"They Don't Believe That I'm Saved" – 4:24 
"Interlude No. 1" – 2:13 
"Operation Liquidation" – 3:47 
"Live It Up" – 5:20 
"Let Us Pray" – 4:26 
"I'll Be Good" – 4:26 
"Interlude No. 2" – 2:38 
"Once Was Blind" (Remix) – 4:35

1999 albums
Gospel Gangstaz albums